The 1915–16 Kansas Jayhawks men's basketball team represented the University of Kansas during the 1915–16 college men's basketball season.

Roster
Hilmar Appel
Lawrence Cole
Leon Gibbens
Walter Kauder
Carl Kennedy
Harold Lytle
Lawrence Nelson
Darwin Pattinson
John Reber
Rudolf Uhrlaub

Schedule and results

References

Kansas
Kansas Jayhawks men's basketball seasons
Kansas Jayhawks Men's Basketball Team
Kansas Jayhawks Men's Basketball Team